The Zeitschrift für Geomorphologie is a peer-reviewed scientific journal about geomorphology. The journal is indexed in Science Citation Index, GeoRef, Geodok and Scopus. It is published by E. Schweizerbart.

External links 
 

Earth and atmospheric sciences journals
Multilingual journals
Geomorphology journals
E. Schweizerbart academic journals